Keezhakkanavai or Keelakkanavai is a small village in Perambalur district, Tamil Nadu (Tamil: தமிழ்நாடு pronunciation (help·info), English: "Country of the Tamils"), India. It is situated between Perambalur and Chettikulam, around 10 km from Perambalur.

Economy and services
Agriculture is the most important economic activity. As no river passes by the village, people store rainwater in lakes and ponds, which is helpful during the summer. People use well water for irrigation and drinking.

It has one Post office which serves three villages (Renganathapuram, Tambiranpatti and keelakkanavai) nearby and few provisional stores to fulfil the peoples daily needs. Also there is Part time Fair price shop (Civil supply) operating from 4 September 2010.

Temples 
The most famous temple is called Mariyamman Temple. There are also many temples in and around Keezhakkanavai. Sirvachur Madhura kali amman temple and Chettikulam Murugan temple are very popular. There is some yearly festival like Amman Thiruvizha, Deewali and pongal are celebrated.

Schools and colleges 
, construction was expected to begin on a Central Government Polytechnic College.

Numerous colleges and schools are being built in and around the village. There are Government schools and Matriculation schools in and around Keezhakkanavai. Dhanalakshmi Srinivan Engg. college is nearby in the village Aranarai(Perambalur), which is 5 km from Keezhakkanavai. Sri Ramakrishna Matriculation school at Perambalur which is about 8 km from Keezhakkanavai.

People 
The majority of the people who live in Keezhakkanavai are original South Indian people. All of them have Tamil as their primary language.

Transportation 
It has more or less an hour away from the town. There are buses from Perambalur to Keezhakkanavai. The major city bus is 9,9A,9B and two other government buses and additionally regularly one Chennai bus from Chettikulam to Chennai via Keezhakkanavai. Private buses are Dhanalakshmi Srinivan Transport, Renganathan Transport, Palanimurugan Transport and SKP Transport.

Roads
 Perambalur-Chettikulam
 Perambalur-Chettikulam-Thuraiyur
 Perambalur-Chettikulam-Trichy
 Chettikulam-Perambalur-Chennai

Train

 Ariyalur
 Trichy ( It is well connected by rail to major cities like Chennai, Bangalore, Cochin, coimbatore).

Nearby cities and towns 

 Trichy—48 km away
 Salem—105 km away
 Thuraiyur—34 km away
 Chettikulam—12 km away
 Ariyalur—38 km away

Villages in Perambalur district